Sparganothis violaceana is a species of moth of the family Tortricidae. It is found in North America, including Alberta, Connecticut, Maine, Manitoba, Maryland, Massachusetts, Minnesota, New Brunswick, New Hampshire, New Jersey, Nova Scotia, Ontario, Pennsylvania, Quebec and Virginia.

The wingspan is 16–21 mm. The outer three-fourths of the forewings are violet and the thorax and inner quarter of the forewings are dark yellow. Adults have been recorded on wing from May to June.

The larvae feed on Vaccinium species.

References

Moths described in 1869
Sparganothis